Coleophora alticolella is a moth of the family Coleophoridae, found in Europe and North America.

Descriptions
The wingspan is 10–12 mm. Head pale ochreous. Antennae white, ringed with light fuscous anteriorly except at apex. Forewings light yellow-ochreous ; costa white to near apex ; veins marked with fine whitish lines ; costal cilia posteriorly pale yellow-ochreous, tips white. Hindwings grey.  Adults are on wing from June to July and possibly again from late April to May.

First generation larvae feed on the seedheads of rushes (Juncus species), woodrush (Luzula species) and club-rush (Scirpus species), while the second generation feeds on glasswort (Salicornia species). They create a whitish case with yellowish brown granules. It is about 6 mm long with a mouth angle of 0°-5°.

Distribution
The moth is found in most of Europe (including Iceland) and is also known from North America.

References

alticolella
Moths described in 1849
Moths of Europe
Moths of North America
Taxa named by Philipp Christoph Zeller